Les Avenières is a former commune in the Isère department in the Rhône-Alpes region of south-eastern France. On 1 January 2016, it was merged into the new commune of Les Avenières-Veyrins-Thuellin.

The inhabitants of the commune are known as Avenièrants or Avenièrantes.

Geography
Les Avenières lies on the left bank of the Rhône as it loops north some 25 km east by north-east of Bourgoin-Jallieu and 25 km west by north-west of Chambéry. The Rhone river forms the north-eastern border of the commune and is also the border between Isère and Ain departments. Access to the commune is by road D450 from Veyrins-Thuellin in the south-west which goes to the village then continues south-east to Saint-Genix-sur-Guiers. The D33 goes from Morestel in the north-west and passes through the north of the commune and across the Rhône bridge where it becomes the D10 and goes north-east to join the D19. The D40B goes north from the village to join the D33. The D40E connects the  D40 at the eastern edge of the commune to the D40B. Apart from the village there are the hamlets of Le Chamolay, Curtille, Le Grand Chaffard, Le Maitre, Le Bessey, Le Sablonnet, and Les Nappes. The commune has a large forest in the north-east on the Île Molettes with a large urban area in the centre mixed with farmland, and in the south mixed forest and farmland.

The north-western border of the commune consists entirely of a left branch of the Rhône river as it loops north on its course through Lyon south to the Mediterranean. The Grand Canal de l'Huert forms the south-western border of the commune which curves to join the Huert river which is part of the northern border of the commune. The Canal du Champ forms the southern border of the commune where it connects the Grand Canal de l'Huert to the Bièvre river which forms the south-eastern border of the commune flowing north-east to join the Rhône.

Neighbouring communes and villages

Toponymy
The name Avenières is derived from the Franco-Provençal avena meaning "oats".

History

Prehistory
From the late Neolithic to the middle Bronze Age the region was inhabited by farmers. A scythe found in Les Avenières region is preserved in the Vienne Museum. It is the only evidence of human occupation before the Gallo-Romans. It was found at the confluence of the Bièvre and the Rhône.

Roman Era
In 1989 maintenance work undertaken in the La Cour du Pont district led to the discovery of two oak piles at a depth of 2 metres. A Carbon-14 study undertaken by the centre for chronology at the Claude Bernard University Lyon 1 (CNRS) gave a date between 39 BC and 120 AD.  It is possible that they were piles for a Gallo-Roman bridge used to cross the Rhone between Les Avenières and Thuellin.

From the Middle Ages to modern times
In 1330 Aigline de Gerbais was married to Louis de Rivoire, knight, lord of Romagnieu, Domessin, la Bâtie-Montgascon, Villeneuve de Ciers (les Avenières), and Bruzolo en Piémont.
In 1496 notes and coins prove that Humbert of Baternay was deprived of the proceeds of the sale and transfer of the lands of Dolomieu and Avenières by King Charles VIII.
In October 1496 Charles VIII issued Letters Patent ceding Dolomieu and Avenieres to Humbert of Bagternay.
On 22 January 1560 copies were made of letters agreed to by King Charles with René de Baternay on the subject of the lands of Ornacieux,  Dolomieu, and Les Avenières.
On 8 October 1609 Gabrielle de Baternay, widow of Gaspard de la Chastre, sold the lands and lordships of Avenières and Brangues as well as the Barony of Bouchage to M. of Granieu and Dorgeoise.
In July 1523 letters from François I stated that the possession of the lands of Dolomieu and Avenières was held by René de Baternay. An order from the King's Council showed that René de Baternay would be restored to possession of the lands of Dolomieu and Avenières.
On 15 March 1642 there was a memoir and instructions on the subject of the proceedings of the King's Council regarding the lands of Dolomieu and Avenières.

20th Century

At the beginning of the 20th century the town was served two secondary railways: the Chemin de fer de l'Est de Lyon to Lyon and Aosta, and the Tramways départementaux de l'Isère, which was taken over by Tramways de l'Ouest du Dauphiné, to La Tour-du-Pin. This last operated from 1909 to 1935.

Administration

List of Successive Mayors

Mayors from 1941

Demography
In 2012 the commune had 5,487 inhabitants.

Culture and heritage

Civil heritage
The Chateau Bertaudières
The Chateau Cerisier
The Chateau Eau-Morte
The André Moiroud Stadium (formerly Epinettes Stadium), owned by the HOC
The Walibi Rhône-Alpes Amusement Park

Religious heritage

The Church of Buvin. The Church contains a Bronze Bell (1661) which is registered as an historical object.

Environmental heritage
The alluvial area of Rhône du Pont de Groslée at Murs-et-Gélignieux
The Huert river and wetland
The Corangle wetland
The Corneille wetland and lake

See also
Communes of the Isère department

Bibliography
Aimé Bocquet, The problem of palafittic occupation in the north of lower Dauphiné. From the late Neolithic to the middle Bronze Ages, Bulletin de la Société préhistorique française, Vol. 64, No. 2, 1967, pp. 501–516 
Ulysse Robert, General catalogue of manuscripts in the public libraries of France: Departments, Plon, Nourrit & cie (Paris), 1903, Vol. 41 
N2007-RA-0098, Bleu Stéphane, 2007, Gallia, adlfi website

References

External links
Les Avenières official website 
Les Avenières on Géoportail, National Geographic Institute (IGN) website 
les Avenieres on the 1750 Cassini Map

Former communes of Isère